Litmanen is a Finnish surname. Notable people with the surname include:

 Jari Litmanen (born 1971), Finnish footballer, son of Olavi
 Olavi Litmanen (born 1945), Finnish footballer

Finnish-language surnames